Gary Dhurrkay (4 March 1974 – 21 August 2005) was an Australian rules footballer and Aboriginal Australian community leader.

Dhurkkay was a part of the East Fremantle Football Club 1994 premiership in the WAFL. He then played for Fremantle in its 1995 inaugural AFL season.

In 1998, he was relegated back to the WAFL (known as "Westar Rules" during the period 1997-2001) for much of the year and played in the East Fremantle Football Club 1998 premiership. At the end of the season he was delisted by Fremantle. 

The North Melbourne AFL Kangaroos gave him a second chance when they selected him at #31 in the 1998 AFL Draft. Dhurrkay played 21 games in the 1999 and 2000 seasons at North Melbourne Football Club. He retired in mid-2000 to focus on his Aboriginal cultural beliefs and became a leader of the Marngarr community in Arnhem Land, Northern Territory.

At about 5am on 21 August 2005, Dhurkkay died in a car accident on Melville Bay Road, Arnhem Land, NT when his car rolled over and he was thrown from the vehicle. He was 31 years of age at the time of his death.

References

External links

1974 births
2005 deaths
Road incident deaths in the Northern Territory
East Fremantle Football Club players
Fremantle Football Club players
Indigenous Australians from Western Australia
North Melbourne Football Club players
Wanderers Football Club players
Indigenous Australian players of Australian rules football
Australian rules footballers from the Northern Territory
Allies State of Origin players
Palmerston Football Club players
St Mary's Football Club (NTFL) players